Khair Khaneh is an archaeological site located near Kabul, Afghanistan. A Brahmanical Hindu temple was excavated there in the 1930s by Joseph Hackin. The construction of the Khair Khaneh temple itself is dated to 608-630 CE, at the beginning of the Turk Shahis period. Most of the remains, including marble statuettes, date to the 7th–8th century, during the time of the Turk Shahi.

References

Archaeological sites in Afghanistan
History of Hinduism
Hinduism in Kabul
Hinduism in Afghanistan
Hindu art
Former populated places in Afghanistan